The list of shipwrecks in September 1945 includes ships sunk, foundered, grounded, or otherwise lost during September 1945.

1 September

2 September

5 September

8 September

10 September

11 September

12 September

13 September

15 September

16 September

17 September

18 September

19 September

22 September

24 September

29 September

References

1945-09